Lecithocera ideologa is a moth in the family Lecithoceridae. It was described by Edward Meyrick in 1937. It is found in Mozambique, Namibia and South Africa.

The wingspan is about 15 mm. The forewings are purplish grey irrorated (sprinkled) with dark grey and with the discal stigmata cloudy and dark grey, with an additional spot directly beneath the second. The hindwings are light grey.

References

Moths described in 1937
ideologa
Moths of Africa